St Brigid's GAA Club (Naomh Bríd) is a Gaelic Athletic Association club located in the parishes of Kiltoom and Cam in South County Roscommon, Ireland. They play in green and red colours and their home pitch is at Newpark, Kiltoom. The club was founded in 1944 and is the home club of former Roscommon inter-county player Gerry O'Malley. The club has won one All-Ireland Senior Club Football Championship, beating Ballymun Kickhams in the All-Ireland Club Final on St Patrick's Day, 17 March 2013.

The club fields underage teams from U-8 to U-21 as well as Senior, Intermediate and Junior teams. There are ladies Gaelic football teams at all ages.

On 25 November 2012, the club achieved a three-in-a-row of Connacht Senior Club Football Championship titles, defeating Ballaghaderreen by 1–12 to 0–6, becoming only the second club team in Connacht ever to achieve such. The club's U-21 team has also set a record, achieving an unprecedented eight county titles in a row from 2002 to 2009.

In 2005, St Brigid's created history by being the first club in Roscommon to captured Senior, U21 and Minor titles in the Men's grade and the Ladies' grade, all in one year.

Frankie Dolan is the head coach of Brigid's after winning the 2013 All Ireland Senior Club Football Championship title with them as a player.

Recent history

Roscommon Championship
St Brigid's have captured seven county titles since 1997. Under the management of John O'Mahony, they won their first title in 28 years in 1997 after defeating Clan na Gael in the final by 1–8 to 0–8, the goal coming from John Tiernan. They had to wait until 2000 before they reached the final again, but this time lost out to underdogs Kilbride. More defeats came in 2002 to Strokestown and in 2003 to Castlerea St Kevins. In 2005, under the stewardship of Ger Dowd, they reclaimed the Fahey Cup by beating Padraig Pearses 2–9 to 0–11, both goals coming from John Tiernan. In 2006, under Anthony Cunningham, they defended their title in a tough encounter with St Faithleach's on a scoreline of 1–7 to 1–5, the goal courtesy of Garvan Dolan. In 2007, St Brigid's captures the three-in-a-row when they again defeated St. Faithleach's in the final by 1–12 to 0–9. A goal ten minutes from time by Brendan "Dixie" O'Brien sealed the win. In 2010, St Brigid's re-emerged after 2 barren years to secure their 10th Roscommon Senior Football Championship, defeating Elphin by 0–14 to 0–9. 2011 saw St Brigid's repeat the dose again by defeating Elphin in the final by 1–9 to 0–7, the goal being supplied by Damien Kelleher. 2012 resulted in St Brigid's achieving their second three in a row in 8 years, when they defeated Padraig Pearses in Kiltoom, with Frankie Dolan helping himself to two goals in the 2–8 to 0–9 victory. 4 in a row was achieved in 2013 with Western Gaels defeated in Hyde Park in early October. October 2014 saw the drive for five completed when St Brigid's dispatched St Faithleachs 3–12 to 0–7.

Connacht Championship and All-Ireland Series

Their Connacht Club campaigns were mixed up until 2006 when they captured the provincial crown for the first time.

In 1997 they succumbed to a powerful Knockmore (Mayo) team in Kiltoom. In 2005 they reached the Connacht Senior Club Football Championship Final, after defeating Leitrim Champions Kiltubrid after a replay in Kiltoom. In the final in Pearse Stadium in Galway, they were defeated by the superior Salthill-Knocknacarra (Galway), the eventual All-Ireland winners.

However, in 2006, they went all the way and claimed the Shane McGettigan Cup in dramatic circumstances. In the preliminary round they defeated Curry (Sligo) by 1–8 to 1–7. A goal at the start of the game from David O'Connor spurred them on, and a point from Senan Kilbride 5 minutes from the end secured the one-point victory. In the semi-final they defeated favourites and previous All-Ireland winners, Crossmolina (Mayo) by 13pts to 1–6 in Dr. Hyde Park. And it was also in the Hyde that the final took place where they beat favourites Corofin (Galway) with a dramatic injury-time goal from Karol Mannion. The final scoreline was 1–10 to 3–3, meaning Captain Mark O'Carroll received the Shane McGettigan Cup on behalf of St. Brigids.

In the All-Ireland Semi-final on 18 February 2007, they met the Armagh and Ulster Senior Club Football Championship winners, Crossmaglen Rangers, in Cusack Park, Mullingar. Despite facing the most successful club team in recent history, St. Brigids narrowly lost out by 1–11 to 0–11. This was the second year in a row that they were beaten by the eventual All-Ireland winners.

The defence of their Connacht title in 2007 proved unsuccessful however. A comprehensive semi-final win in Tuam over the Padraig Joyce-inspired Killererin, portrayed St. Brigid's in their best light as they ran out 4–10 to 1–11 winners against the Galway champions. The final saw St. Brigid's travel to the home territory of Ballina Stephenites in North Mayo. Two early goals from Ballina provided the cushion that they never relinquished, despite unrelenting effort by St. Brigids. The final score was Ballina 2–8, St. Brigid's 0–12.

In 2010, St Brigid's opened their Connacht campaign with a 0–21 to 0–4-point win in Kiltoom over Sligo champions, Eastern Harps. They followed that up in the Connacht semi-final with a 1–13 to 3–5 win over Leitrim champions, Glencar–Manorhamilton, in Páirc Sean MacDiarmada in Carrick-on-Shannon. In the final, St Brigid's once again had to face down Killererin in Tuam Stadium, a re-match of the 2007 Connacht semi-final. A last gasp Cathal McHugh goal saw St. Brigids force extra-time. In the additional twenty minutes, St Brigid's pulled clear to record a brilliant come from behind victory on a scoreline of 2–14 to 1–10, which resulted in Niall Grehan again lifting the Shane McGettigan Cup for the green and red.

On 26 February 2011, St Brigid's travelled to the Gaelic Grounds in Limerick and beat the Cork and Munster Champions Nemo Rangers on a scoreline of 0–13 to 1–8, to qualify for the All-Ireland Club Final for the first time. In the All-Ireland Final on St Patrick's Day 2011, St Brigid's faced their semi-final conquerors of 2007, Armagh and Ulster Champions, Crossmaglen Rangers. Despite a huge following in Croke Park, St Brigid's failed to overturn the result of 2007 and Crossmaglen prevailed by 2–11 to 1–11.

The Connacht campaign in the last months of 2011 again proved a successful one for St Brigid's and resulted in a Connacht two-in-a-row for the first time. After defeating Sligo champions Tourlestrane by 0–16 to 0–10 in Marckiewicz Park in the semi-final, they then faced Corofin in the final in Kiltoom, a repeat of the 2006 final. After a tense affair, St Brigid's prevailed by 0–11 to 0–10.

In February 2012, St Brigid's lost out in the All-Ireland Senior Club Football Championship semi-final to their near neighbours Garrycastle from Athlone on a scoreline of 1–11 to 1–9 in Pearse Park, Longford. The game was played in front of a large crowd of approximately 10,000 people.

Under the management of Kevin McStay, Liam McHale and Benny O'Brien, St Brigid's secured a three-in-a-row of titles in Connacht in 2012, becoming only the second ever team to achieve that feat. In the quarter final in Kiltoom, Melvin Gaels were beaten by 2–19 to 0–10. St Brigid's then went on the road to beat Salthill-Knocknacarra in the semi-final in Pearse Stadium by 0–15 to 0–8, thereby avenging their defeat in the 2005 Connacht Final at the same venue. The three-in-a-row of Connacht titles, and their fourth in history, was then secured in a foggy and bitterly cold McHale Park, Castlebar, when a dominant second half performance saw the Kiltoom and Cam outfit defeat Mayo champions, Ballaghaderreen by 1–12 to 0–6.

In the All-Ireland semi-final on 16 February 2013, St Brigid's faced their old foe, Armagh and Ulster Champions, Crossmaglen Rangers, who themselves were seeking a three-in-a-row of All-Ireland titles. This time the spoils went to St Brigid's who triumphed by 2–7 to 1–9 following a late goal by Conor McHugh.

St Brigid's captured their first ever All-Ireland Senior title on 17 March 2013 at Croke Park after defeating Ballymun Kickhams with a last-minute point by Frankie Dolan to make the score 2–11 to 2–10 in favour of St.Brigids.

In October 2013, St Brigid's retained the Roscommom senior football title, defeating Western Gaels by 1–13 to 0–9 in the final.

However, St Brigid's failed to complete the four-in-a-row in Connacht. Defeats of Tourlestrane (Sligo) and St Mary's (Leitrim) saw St Brigid's meet Castlebar Mitchels (Mayo) in the Connacht Final at Hyde Park, but they were defeated after extra time, 3–13 to 2–12.

Feile na nGael

The club was represented at the All-Ireland Féile na nGael championships by their under 14 boys team in 2010 and 2011. In 2010 the team travelled to Derry where they were knocked out in the group stages and in 2011 they travelled to Youghal in county Cork where they reached the semi-finals but lost out to a stronger Ahan Gaels team.

Roll of honour

 Roscommon Senior Football Championship: 17
 1953, 1958, 1959, 1963, 1969, 1997, 2005, 2006, 2007, 2010, 2011, 2012, 2013, 2014, 2016, 2017, 2020
 Connacht Senior Club Football Championship: 4
 2006, 2010, 2011, 2012
 All-Ireland Senior Club Football Championship: 1
 2013

Championship winning teams

Roscommon

1997: Aidan Cunniffe, Jimmy Gacquin, Seamus Og McDonnell, Michael O'Brien, Basil Mannion, Padraig Sugrue, Eddie Nestor, Tony Kilcommins, Padraig Kilcommins, John Tiernan, Brendan "Dixie" O'Brien, Benny O'Brien, Frankie Dolan, Tom Og O'Brien(c), Tom Lennon.

2005: Shane Curran, Donal O'Connor, Darragh Donnelly, Robbie Kelly, Ger Ahearne, Kenny Noonan, Padraig Kilcommins, Mark O'Carroll, John Tiernan, Ian Kilbride, Darragh Blaine, Brendan "Dixie" O'Brien (c), Senan Kilbride, Karol Mannion, Frankie Dolan.

2006: James Martin, Robbie Kelly, Padraig Kilcommins, Enda Ruane, Eoin Mannion, Ger Ahearne, Niall Grehan, Mark O'Carroll (c), Karol Mannion, Darragh Blaine, Frankie Dolan, John Tiernan, Brendan "Dixie" O'Brien, David "Jimmy Nail" O'Connor, Garvan Dolan.

2007: Shane Curran, Enda Ruane, Ger Ahearne, Robbie Kelly, Donal O'Connor, Ian Kilbride, Peter Domican, Mark O'Carroll, Karol Mannion, John Tiernan, Frankie Dolan (c), Darragh Blaine, Brendan "Dixie" O'Brien, Senan Kilbride, Cathal McHugh.

2010: Philip Martin, Robbie Kelly, Darragh Donnelly, Niall Grehan (c), Gearoid Cunniffe, Peter Domican, Ian Kilbride, Garvan Dolan, Karol Mannion, John Tiernan, Cathal McHugh, Darren Dolan, Conor McHugh, Senan Kilbride, Frankie Dolan.

2011: James Martin, Darragh Sheehy, Darragh Donnelly (c), Niall Grehan, Eoin Sheehy, Peter Domican, Gearoid Cunniffe, Garvan Dolan, Karol Mannion, Darren Dolan, Cathal McHugh, Damien Kelleher, Padraig Kelly, Senan Kilbride, Frankie Dolan.

2012: Cormac Sheehy, Johnny Murray, Niall Grehan, Ronan Stack, Peter Domican, Darragh Donnelly, Ian Kilbride, Garvan Dolan, Karol Mannion, Gearoid Cunniffe, Richard Blaine, Damien Kelleher, Conor McHugh, Senan Kilbride, Frankie Dolan.

Connacht

2006: James Martin, Robbie Kelly, Padraig Kilcommins, Enda Ruane, Donal O'Connor, Ger Ahearne, Niall Grehan, Mark O'Carroll (c), Karol Mannion, John Tiernan, Frankie Dolan, Brendan "Dixie" O'Brien, Senan Kilbride, David "Jimmy Nail" O'Connor, Conor McHugh.

2010: Philip Martin, Robbie Kelly, Darragh Donnelly, Niall Grehan (c), Gearoid Cunniffe, Peter Domican, Ian Kilbride, Garvan Dolan, Karol Mannion, Darren Dolan, Frankie Dolan, Cathal McHugh, David "Jimmy Nail" O'Connor, Senan Kilbride, Conor McHugh.

2011: James Martin, Robbie Kelly, Darragh Donnelly (c), Darragh Sheehy, Gearoid Cunniffe, Peter Domican, Niall Grehan, Garvan Dolan, Karol Mannion, Eoin Sheehy, Darren Dolan, Damien Kelleher, Cathal McHugh, Senan Kilbride, Frankie Dolan.

2012: Shane Curran, Johnny Murray, Peter Domican, Ronan Stack, Damien Kelleher, Darragh Donnelly, Niall Grehan, Karol Mannion, Ian Kilbride, Gearoid Cunniffe, Garvan Dolan, Eoin Sheehy, Frankie Dolan, Senan Kilbride, Richard Blaine.

All-Ireland

2013: Shane Curran, Gearoid Cunniffe, Peter Domican, Johnny Murray, Niall Grehan, Darragh Donnelly, Ronan Stack, Karol Mannion, Ian Kilbride, Damien Kelleher, Richard Blaine, Darren Dolan, Frankie Dolan, Senan Kilbride, Cathal McHugh. Garvan Dolan, Eoin Sheehy, Conor McHugh, Ger Ahearne, Darragh Sheehy, Mark O'Carroll, David O'Connor, David Nestor, Cormac Sheehy, Eddie Egan, Alan McInerney, Donal O'Connor, Padraig Kelly, Paul Fuery, Shane Mannion, Niall McInerney, Eoin Menton, Thomas Finnerty.

All-Ireland medal winners

Senior Club 2013

See above.

Minor 2006

Peter Domican, Cathal McHugh, Robbie Gilligan.

Junior 2000

Shane Curran, Michael O'Brien, Basil Mannion, Brendan "Dixie" O'Brien, Karol Mannion.

U-21 1966

Gerry Mannion, Jim Keane

Minor 1951

John O'Brien, Frank McKevitt

Minor 1939

Paddy Donnelly, Larry Cummins

Notable managers
 Anthony Cunningham
Larry Murphy
 Kevin McStay

References

External links
Official St Brigid's GAA Club website

Gaelic games clubs in County Roscommon
Gaelic football clubs in County Roscommon